Christmas Is Here is a holiday studio album from Christian Contemporary Christian musician Brandon Heath, released on October 15, 2013 by Reunion Records and produced by Ben Shive. The album achieved commercial success and critical acclaim.

Background
The album was released on October 15, 2013 by Reunion Records and was produced by Ben Shive.

Music and lyrics
At CCM Magazine, Grace S. Aspinwall stated that his slick contemporary voice lends itself well to this material." Furthermore, Stella Blackburn of Cross Rhythms affirmed that because of Heath's vocal being quite "intimate" that allows him to pull of the tunes that are "imaginative and effective acoustic accompaniments and orchestrations". Calvin Moore of The Christian Manifesto wrote that even though Heath never finds a steady channel with his music it does not sound "disjointed", and further noted what really works is "Heath's lithe tenor vocals, the dreamy instrumentation, and the use of magical backing choral voices here and there." CM Addict's Grace Thorson believed that the listener might be astonished with the lyricism, and at Indie Vision Music Jonathan Andre noted that while the album lacks significantly in the drums and electric guitar it was rectified with excellent "heart, emotion, poignancy, and hope." Andre wrote that the album gets into a myriad of styles and genres with contemplative songs in the vein of jazz, motown, and blues through acoustic and upbeat French horns. At Christian Music Zine, Joshua Andre commented that the album showed Heath was an excellent songwriter and the album highlights his "raw emotion, vocal strength, and knack for creating God inspired moments; it is these facts that overshadow the lack of electric guitar and hard hitting drums."

Critical reception

Christmas Is Here garnered critical acclaim from music critics. At CCM Magazine, Grace S. Aspinwall rated the album four stars out of five, which she felt that the artist did not disappoint on the offering, and claimed that the release was destined "to become a holiday classic". Stella Redburn rated the album an eight out of ten, and affirmed that the release was good, perhaps a classic. At Jesus Freak Hideout, Ryan Barbee rated the album four-and-a-half stars out of five, evoking that this was not just merely Christmas song with Heath's voice but comes across as "something heartfelt, original, and creative." In addition, Barbee proclaimed the release is going to be hoisted up into the pantheon of exemplary Christmas tunes. Mark Geil of Jesus Freak Hideout rated the album four stars, and simply noted the album as being "great". At New Release Tuesday, Sarah Fine rated the album three-and-a-half out of five stars, and called the album unconventional, a trait which Heath has a proclivity for in his music. At Christian Music Zine, Joshua Andre rated the album 4.25-out-of-five, and wrote that the release was "unique, musically creative, and emotive".

At The Phantom Tollbooth, Michael Dalton rated it a perfect five stars, and affirmed that "If Christmas songs seem stale, and you wonder if they can ever sound fresh, Heath and producer Ben Shive answer a resounding 'yes!'" Jay Heilman of Christian Music Review rated the album a four-and-a-half out of five stars, calling it a "stand-out" because of his enthrallment with the traditional holiday song fare. At The Christian Manifesto, Calvin Moore rated the album four stars out of five, commenting that while the release is nothing revolutionary, at the same time, it is a highly gratifying offering because the jingles come across as "Simple. Fun. Elegant. Classy." Grace Thorson of CM Addict rated the album four out of five stars and believed the album is destined to join some holiday best albums. However, Indie Vision Music's Jonathan Andre rated the album three stars out of five, criticizing the material for not being able to please a vast array of audiences. Yet, Andre praised Heath for creating a "unique, different, powerful and compelling Christmas album".

Track listing

Personnel 
 Brandon Heath – vocals, arrangements 
 Ben Shive – keyboards, acoustic piano, programming, arrangements 
 Nathan Dugger – organ, guitars 
 Ron Block – acoustic guitar 
 Sierra Hull – mandolin
 Rob Ickes – dobro
 Barry Bales – bass 
 Matt Pierson – bass 
 Josh Robinson – drums 
 Chris West – saxophones 
 Roy Agee – trombone
 Keith Smith – trumpet, flugelhorn, French horn
 John Catchings – cello 
 Monisa Angell – viola 
 David Angell – violin
 Matt Combs – violin 
 David Davidson – violin 
 Randall Goodgame – backing vocals 
 Ellie Holcomb – backing vocals
 Sonya Isaacs – backing vocals 
 Joe Moralez – backing vocals 
 Matt Wertz – backing vocals 

Choir
 Chance Scoggins – choir director 
 Jennifer Carter, Sherry Carter, Lori Casteel, Jeremi Henderson, Shelley Jennings, Tammy Jensen, Melodie Kirkpatrick, Cindy Roberts, Leah Taylor, Terry White and David Wise – choir singers

Production 
 Ben Shive – producer 
 Terry Hemmings – executive producer 
 Jordyn Thomas – A&R 
 Buckley Miller – engineer 
 Brown Bannister – assistant engineer 
 David Han – assistant engineer 
 Justin March – assistant engineer 
 Evan Redwine – assistant engineer 
 Bobby Shin – horn engineer, string engineer, editing 
 Shane D. Wilson – mixing 
 Joe Causey – editing 
 Keith Smith – editing 
 Andrew Mendelson – mastering 
 Michelle Box – A&R production 
 Beth Lee – art direction 
 Tim Parker – art direction, design 
 Jeremy Cowart – photography 
 Kelly Henderson – grooming 

Studios
 Recorded at The Smoakstack (Nashville, Tennessee).
 Overdubbed at Townsend Sound Studios (Nashville, Tennessee).
 Horns and Strings recorded at Little Big Sound (Nashville, Tennessee).
 Mastered at Georgetown Masters (Nashville, Tennessee).

Charts
Christmas Is Here charted at No. 24 on the Billboard Top Christian Albums charting week of December 21, 2013.

References

2013 Christmas albums
Brandon Heath albums
Reunion Records albums
Christmas albums by American artists
Pop rock Christmas albums